The Laurence Olivier Award for Outstanding Achievement in Dance is an annual award presented by the Society of London Theatre in recognition of achievements in commercial London theatre. The awards were established as the Society of West End Theatre Awards in 1976, and renamed in 1984 in honour of English actor and director Laurence Olivier.

This award was first presented in 1977, as Outstanding Achievement of the Year in Ballet, then was retitled to Outstanding Individual Performance of the Year in a New Dance Production in 1983, before settling on the current title in 1986. With the exception of 1983–1985, when the criteria focused only on an individual dancer, this award`s criteria covers the breadth of a commingled group of specialties, including: dancers, choreographers, designers (individual or combination of costume, visual, set, lightingin dance, as opposed to the individual Olivier awards for designer categories, which also exist), and artistic directors.

Winners and nominees

1970s

1980s

1990s

2000s

2010s

2020s

References

External links
 

Laurence Olivier Awards